Engelbert III, Count of Gorizia (died 1220) was a member of the Meinhardiner dynasty.  He ruled the County of Gorizia from 1191 until his death.

Engelbert's father was Engelbert II, Count Palatine of Carinthia and Count of Gorizia.  His mother was Adelaide, the daughter of Count Otto I of Wittelsbach.  In 1191, Engelbert III inherited the County of Gorizia jointly with his brother Meinhard II.  During his reign, Engelbert acquired the title of Vogt of Aquileia.  He also acted as bailiff of Millstatt.

In 1183, he married a noble lady named Matilda, Countess of Pisino. In 1190, he remarried, to Matilda of Andechs, the daughter of Margrave Berthold I of Istria. The latter Matilda was the mother of his successor Meinhard III.

References

Sources

External links 
 Genealogy of the Middle Ages

Counts of Gorizia
12th-century births
1220 deaths